Erbium(III) bromide is a chemical compound with the chemical formula ErBr3 crystal which is highly soluble in water. It is used, like other metal bromide compounds, in water treatment, chemical analysis and for certain crystal growth applications.

References

Erbium compounds
Bromides
Lanthanide halides